Teaser is the fifth studio album by American R&B singer Angela Bofill, released on October 27, 1983 by Arista Records. The album cover was credited to Mick Rock.

Track listing
Side one
"Special Delivery" (Jeffrey Cohen, Narada Michael Walden, Preston Glass)
"Call of the Wild" (Richard Wolf, Wayne Perkins)
"Nothin' But a Teaser" (Alan Glass, Narada Michael Walden, Preston Glass)
"I'm on Your Side" (Angela Bofill, Jeffrey Cohen, Narada Michael Walden)
Side two
"Penetration" (Jeffrey Cohen, Narada Michael Walden)
"You're a Special Part of Me" featuring Johnny Mathis (Angela Bofill, Loree Gold)
"Still a Thrill" (Preston Glass, Narada Michael Walden)
"Gotta Make It Up to You" (Angela Bofill, Jeffrey Cohen, Narada Michael Walden)
"Crazy for Him" (Ellen Schwartz, Loree Gold, Roger Bruno)

Personnel
Angela Bofill - lead and backing vocals
Narada Michael Walden - drums, keyboards, percussion
Jorge Bermudez - Percussion
Michel Colombier, David Sancious - keyboards
John Robinson - drums
Randy Jackson, Abe Laboriel - bass guitar
Corrado Rustici, David Williams  - guitar
Marc Russo - saxophone
Frank Martin - vocoder
Preston Glass - church bells
Boni Boyer, Bunny Hull, Edward Hawkins, Jim Gilstrap, John Lehman, Linette Hawkins, Preston Glass, Tramaine Hawkins, Walter Hawkins - backing vocals
Michael Gibbs - string arrangements

Charts

References

External links
 Angela Bofill - Teaser at Discogs

1983 albums
Angela Bofill albums
Albums produced by Narada Michael Walden
Arista Records albums
Albums with cover art by Mick Rock
Dance-pop albums by American artists